Ghost Soup is a 1992 Japanese TV drama produced for Fuji TV as part of their part of the food-themed drama series, La Cuisine by Shunji Iwai.

Plot
It's Christmas Eve in Tokyo as Ichiro is moving into his new apartment one month ahead of schedule. As he is getting settled in, two strangers enter the apartment and are surprised to find him there. They begin complaining that he is upsetting their plans for a Christmas party to be thrown in the apartment that night before attempting to kick him out.

External links 
 

1992 films
1990s Japanese-language films
Films directed by Shunji Iwai
1990s Japanese films